Ambient 1: A Brief History of Ambient is a 1993 compilation album released on the Virgin Records label, as part of their Ambient series. The album was issued as a double CD, compiled by Simon Hopkins.

Track listing
Source: Allmusic

References

1993 compilation albums
Ambient compilation albums